Bruce Harris may refer to:
 Bruce Harris (politician), mayor of Chatham Borough, New Jersey
 Bruce C. Harris, British charity executive
 Bruce Harris (journalist), English sports journalist

See also
 John Bruce Harris, politician in Saskatchewan
 Bruce Harris Craven, American novelist, screenwriter, and educator.